PEN International (known as International PEN until 2010) is a worldwide association of writers, founded in London in 1921 to promote friendship and intellectual co-operation among writers everywhere. The association has autonomous International PEN centers in over 100 countries.

Other goals included: to emphasise the role of literature in the development of mutual understanding and world culture; to fight for freedom of expression; and to act as a powerful voice on behalf of writers harassed, imprisoned and sometimes killed for their views.

History
The first PEN Club was founded at the Florence Restaurant in London on October 5, 1921, by Catherine Amy Dawson Scott, with John Galsworthy as its first president. Its first members included Joseph Conrad, Elizabeth Craig, George Bernard Shaw, and H. G. Wells.

PEN originally stood for "Poets, Essayists, Novelists", but now stands for "Poets, Playwrights, Editors, Essayists, Novelists", and includes writers of any form of literature, such as journalists and historians.

The club established these aims:
To promote intellectual co-operation and understanding among writers;
To create a world community of writers that would emphasize the central role of literature in the development of world culture; and,
To defend literature against the many threats to its survival which the modern world poses.

The president of PEN International is Burhan Sönmez. Past presidents have included E. M. Forster, Alberto Moravia, Heinrich Böll, Arthur Miller, Mario Vargas Llosa, Homero Aridjis, Jiří Gruša, John Ralston Saul and Jennifer Clement.

Structure and status
PEN International is headquartered in London and composed of autonomous PEN Centres in over 100 countries around the world, each of which are open to writers, journalists, translators, historians and others actively engaged in any branch of literature, regardless of nationality, race, colour, or religion.

It is a non-governmental organization in formal consultative relations with UNESCO and Special Consultative Status with the Economic and Social Council of the United Nations.

Charter
PEN summarises its Charter, based on resolutions passed at its International Congresses:

Writers in Prison Committee
PEN International Writers in Prison Committee works on behalf of persecuted writers worldwide. Established in 1960 in response to increasing attempts to silence voices of dissent by imprisoning writers, the Writers in Prison Committee monitors the cases of as many as 900 writers annually who have been imprisoned, tortured, threatened, attacked, made to disappear, and killed for the peaceful practice of their profession. It publishes a bi-annual Case List documenting free expression violations against writers around the world.

The committee also coordinates the PEN International membership's campaigns that aim towards an end to these attacks and to the suppression of freedom of expression worldwide.

PEN International Writers in Prison Committee is a founding member of the International Freedom of Expression Exchange (IFEX), a global network of 90 non-governmental organisations that monitors censorship worldwide and defends journalists, writers, internet users and others who are persecuted for exercising their right to freedom of expression.

It is also a member of IFEX's Tunisia Monitoring Group (TMG), a coalition of twenty-one free expression organisations that began lobbying the Tunisian government to improve its human rights record in 2005. Since the Arab Spring events that led to the collapse of the Tunisian government, TMG has worked to ensure constitutional guarantees of free expression and human rights within the country.

On 15 January 2016, PEN International joined human rights organisations  and the International Campaign for Human Rights in Iran, along with seven other organisations, to protest against the 2013 imprisonment and 2015 sentencing of musicians Mehdi Rajabian and Yousef Emadi, and filmmaker Hossein Rajabian, and called on the head of the judiciary and other Iranian authorities to drop the charges against them.

Salil Tripathi is the Chair of this committee.

PEN affiliated awards

The various PEN affiliations offer many literary awards across a broad spectrum.

Memorials

A grove of trees beside Lake Burley Griffin forms the PEN International memorial in Canberra, Australian Capital Territory. The dedication reads: "The spirit dies in all of us who keep silent in the face of tyranny." The memorial was officially opened on 17 November 1997.

A cast-iron sculpture entitled Witness, commissioned by English PEN to mark their 90th anniversary and created by Antony Gormley, stands outside the British Library in London. It depicts an empty chair, and is inspired by the symbol used for 30 years by English PEN to represent imprisoned writers around the world. It was unveiled on 13 December 2011.

Members

Homero Aridjis, President Emeritus.
Carmen Aristegui
Margaret Atwood
Thomas G. Bergin
Heinrich Böll
Jorge Luis Borges
Marcelo Moraes Caetano
Karel Čapek
J. M. Coetzee
Joseph Conrad
Elizabeth Craig
Sidney Dark
Maria Dąbrowska
Hermann Friedmann
Nadine Gordimer
Gloria Guardia
Zofia Kossak-Szczucka
Robie Macauley
Thomas Mann
Predrag Matvejević
Arthur Miller
Charles Langbridge Morgan
Toni Morrison
Zofia Nałkowska
Octavio Paz
Harold Pinter
J. K. Rowling
Michael Scammell
George Bernard Shaw
Mieczysław Smolarski
William Styron
Carl Tighe
Luisa Valenzuela
Theodor Kramer

Presidents

See also

 Day of the Imprisoned Writer
 International Freedom of Expression Exchange
 International PEN centers – 145+ PEN centers around the world.
 English PEN – The founding centre of PEN International, located in London
 PEN America – Located in New York City.
 PEN Canada – Located in Toronto, Canada.
 Sydney PEN – One of the three PEN centers of Australia, located in Sydney.
 PEN Centre Germany – Established in 1924.
 Hungarian PEN Club – Established in 1926.
 PEN Ukraine – Established in 1989.
 PEN literary awards – as awarded by and in conjunction with PEN centers around the world.
 Tunisia Monitoring Group

References

Bibliography
 .

External links

 PEN International
 PEN America
 PEN Canada
 English PEN
 PEN Centre Germany (PEN-Zentrum Deutschland)
 French PEN Center (PEN Club Français)
 PEN Monaco
 PEN Turkey Center (PEN Türkiye Merkezi)

 
1921 establishments in England
Freedom of expression organizations
International organisations based in London
International professional associations
Organisations based in the London Borough of Southwark
Organizations established in 1921
Professional associations based in the United Kingdom
Writers' organizations